HC, hc or H/C may refer to:

Science, technology, and mathematics

Medicine 
 Health Canada
 Hemicrania continua
 Hyperelastosis cutis or hereditary equine regional dermal asthenia

Chemistry 
 Hemocyanin, a metalloprotein abbreviated Hc
 HC smoke, a US military designation for Hexachloroethane
 Homocapsaicin, a capsaicinoid
Hydrocarbon, a category of substances consisting only of hydrogen and carbon

Other uses in science, technology, and mathematics
 74HC-series integrated circuits, a logic family of integrated circuits
 Felix HC, a series of Romanian personal microcomputers produced by ICE Felix Bucharest and which were ZX Spectrum clones
 Hemianthus callitrichoides, a freshwater aquatic plant native to Cuba
 + h.c., a notation used in mathematics and quantum physics

Sports 
 Head Coach
 Hors catégorie (French), used in cycle races to designate a climb that is "beyond categorization"
 UCI .HC road cycling races (1.HC and 2.HC), the second tier of events in the sport, after the UCI World Tour

Other uses 
 Heritage Corridor, a Metra commuter rail line running from Chicago to Joliet, Illinois
 Highway contract route, an outsourced United States Postal Service delivery method, formerly known as Star routes
 Honorary degree, or honoris causa
 Hors de commerce, prints similar to Artist Proofs except they are only available through the artist directly
 Hospitality Club, an internet-based hospitality service
 Houston Chronicle, newspaper of record of Houston, Texas
 Aero-Tropics Air Services (IATA airline designator HC)
 Disability, acronym for Handicap/Handicapped 
 High-cube container, a type of intermodal shipping container